Mahaguru Phalgunanda also known as "Mahaguru Phalgunanda" or Phalgunanda Lingden (1885–1949) was a leader of Kirat religion in Nepal Kirat people of Nepal.

Early life 
Falgunanda Lingden was born on 10 November 1885 in Ilam district of Nepal.

Career 
He is known as Mahaguru (the great teacher), especially among the Limbu, Rai, Sunuwar, Yakhkha, Lohorung, Dhimal and Jurel Kirat people. He is credited with the continuation of the ancient Kirat religion on puritan principles, which include vegetarianism, a ban on alcohol and following Limbu traditions and scripts. He is remembered for his socio-cultural and religious messages. His main message includes calling for a ban on animal sacrifice since this taboo raises social expenditures on celebrations such as births, weddings and funerals. He also called for the elimination of social orthodoxies and supports running a school for children, especially through their mother tongue.

Beliefs 
He believed education brings knowledge to wash one's heart clean, which alone is the key to emancipation. For Falgunanda, emancipation is the Ultimate Truth to realize God. His philosophy features love and non-violence. He built many shrines. He died in 1949.

The Nepal Postal Services Department issued a postal stamp in his honor as part of its Distinguished Personalities Series in 1993. He is the 16th luminary of Nepal.

References

1885 births
1949 deaths
People from Ilam District
National heroes of Nepal